Jeter Connelly Pritchard (1857–1921) was a U.S. Senator from North Carolina from 1895 to 1903. Senator Pritchard may also refer to:

James Pritchard (politician) (1763–1813), Ohio State Senate
Joel Pritchard (1925–1997), Washington State Senate